Joseph Malone (born 15 February 1957) is an Irish archer. He competed in the men's individual event at the 1988 Summer Olympics.

References

External links
 

1957 births
Living people
Irish male archers
Olympic archers of Ireland
Archers at the 1988 Summer Olympics
Place of birth missing (living people)